The buff-throated purpletuft (Iodopleura pipra) is a small species of South American bird in the family Tityridae. It has traditionally been placed in the cotinga family, but evidence strongly suggest it is better placed in Tityridae, where now placed by SACC.

It is endemic to the Atlantic Forest in eastern Brazil. It is becoming rare due to habitat loss.

References

buff-throated purpletuft
Birds of the Atlantic Forest
Endemic birds of Brazil
buff-throated purpletuft
Taxonomy articles created by Polbot